Kate Alexandra Lundy (born 15 December 1967) is a former Labor Party member of the Australian Senate, representing the Australian Capital Territory. Lundy served as the Minister for Multicultural Affairs and the Minister Assisting for the Digital Economy in the Second Rudd Ministry; having previously served as the Minister for Sport and the Minister Assisting the Minister for Industry and Innovation.

Background and early career
Born in Sydney, Lundy left school without completing Year 11 and did not tell her parents. She went to work on a construction site. She became the trade union representative and began her career in the Building Workers' Industrial Union.

Political career

In 1996, aged 28, Lundy became the youngest woman from the Australian Labor Party to be elected to the federal parliament; since superseded by Kate Ellis. She replaced Bob McMullan in the Senate when he moved to a lower house seat in that year's election.

After the 1998 election, Lundy was made Shadow Minister for Sport and Youth Affairs and Shadow Minister Assisting the Shadow Minister for Industry and Technology on Information Technology. In 2001 she became Shadow Minister for Information Technology and Sport. She added the Arts and Recreation to her responsibilities in 2003 after Mark Latham became federal Labor leader. She was Shadow Minister for Manufacturing and Consumer Affairs from October 2004 to June 2005, when she was appointed Shadow Minister for Sport and Recreation. With the election of Kevin Rudd as Leader of the Parliamentary Labor Party in December 2006, the responsibilities of Health Promotion and Local Government were added to Lundy's responsibilities for Sport and Recreation.

Following the 2007 federal election, Lundy was replaced by Kate Ellis, who was appointed as Minister for Sport and Minister for Youth.

On 11 September 2010, Lundy was appointed Parliamentary Secretary for Immigration and Citizenship as well as Parliamentary Secretary to the Prime Minister and Cabinet as part of the original Second Gillard Ministry. In a subsequent reshuffle in March 2012, Lundy was appointed as the Minister for Sport following the retirement of Senator Mark Arbib, and she was also made Minister for Multicultural Affairs, and Minister Assisting the Minister for Industry and Innovation. On 1 July 2013, as part of the Second Rudd Ministry, Lundy retained the portfolio of Multicultural Affairs and gained the portfolio of Minister Assisting for the Digital Economy. Don Farrell was appointed as Minister for Sport.

Lundy is a member of the Socialist Left faction of Labor. She has been highly active on the issue of internet regulation, arguing against both the Howard government's and her own party's policy in that area. Lundy is also patron of the Canberra Rowing Club and the Pearcey Foundation.

On 26 November 2014, Lundy announced that she would not stand for re-election at the 2016 federal election. She resigned from the Senate on 24 March 2015, and the next day former ACT Chief Minister Katy Gallagher was appointed as her replacement by the ACT Legislative Assembly.

Awards
In 2010 Lundy won the International Top 10 People Changing the World of Internet and Politics at the 11th World eDemocracy Forum which was held in Paris, France.

See also
 First Gillard Ministry
 Second Gillard Ministry
 Second Rudd Ministry

References

External links

Kate Lundy, Senate Biography
The Big Read: ACT Senator Kate Lundy talks divorce, dismay and drugs in sport Courier Mail 13 June 2013
 Summary of parliamentary voting for Senator Kate Lundy on TheyVoteForYou.org.au

Australian Labor Party members of the Parliament of Australia
Labor Left politicians
Members of the Australian Senate
Members of the Australian Senate for the Australian Capital Territory
Australian bloggers
Women members of the Australian Senate
1967 births
Living people
Delegates to the Australian Constitutional Convention 1998
20th-century Australian politicians
Women government ministers of Australia
Australian women bloggers
20th-century Australian women politicians
21st-century Australian politicians
21st-century Australian women politicians
Government ministers of Australia